In mathematics, especially in the area of abstract algebra dealing with ordered structures on abelian groups, the Hahn embedding theorem gives a simple description of all linearly ordered abelian groups. It is named after Hans Hahn.

Overview
The theorem states that every linearly ordered abelian group G can be embedded as an ordered subgroup of the additive group ℝΩ endowed with a lexicographical order, where ℝ is the additive group of real numbers (with its standard order), Ω is the set of Archimedean equivalence classes of G, and ℝΩ is the set of all functions from Ω to ℝ which vanish outside a well-ordered set.
   
Let 0 denote the identity element of G. For any nonzero element g of G, exactly one of the elements g or −g is greater than 0; denote this element by |g|.  Two nonzero elements g and h of G are Archimedean equivalent if there exist natural numbers N and M such that N|g| > |h| and M|h| > |g|.  Intuitively, this means that neither g nor h is "infinitesimal" with respect to the other.  The group G is Archimedean if all nonzero elements are Archimedean-equivalent.  In this case, Ω is a singleton, so ℝΩ is just the group of real numbers.  Then Hahn's Embedding Theorem reduces to Hölder's theorem (which states that a linearly ordered abelian group is Archimedean if and only if it is a subgroup of the ordered additive group of the real numbers).

 gives a clear statement and proof of the theorem. See also .

See also
 Archimedean group

References

 
 
 
 
 

Ordered groups
Theorems in group theory